Periophthalmodon is a genus of mudskippers found along muddy shores, estuaries and lower reaches of rivers in Southeast Asia, Papua New Guinea and Queensland, Australia.

Species
There are currently three species in the genus:
 Periophthalmodon freycineti (Quoy & Gaimard, 1824) (Pug-headed mudskipper)
 Periophthalmodon schlosseri (Pallas, 1770) (Giant mudskipper)
 Periophthalmodon septemradiatus (F. Hamilton, 1822)

References

 
Mudskippers
Oxudercinae
Amphibious fish